Psidopala undulans is a moth in the family Drepanidae. It was described by George Hampson in 1893. It is found in Myanmar, India and Tibet, China.

References

Moths described in 1893
Thyatirinae
Moths of Asia